Carl Roth may refer to:

Carl Roth (basketball) (1909–1966), American basketball player and coach
Carl Roth of Nedre Fösked (1712–1788), Swedish blacksmith, farrier and ironmaster
Carl Roth II (1753–1832), Swedish ironmaster 
Carl Reinhold Roth (1797–1858), Swedish businessman and ironmaster